Hugo Gabriel Gryn (pronouned green) (25 June 1930 – 18 August 1996) was a British Reform rabbi, a national broadcaster and a leading voice in interfaith dialogue.

Hugo Gryn was born into a prosperous Jewish family in the market town of Berehovo in Carpathian Ruthenia, which was then in Czechoslovakia and is now in Ukraine. His parents, who married in 1929, were Geza Gryn (1900–1945), a timber merchant, and Bella Neufeld.

Gryn's family were deported to Auschwitz in 1944. Hugo and his mother survived but his ten-year-old brother, Gabriel, was gassed on arrival at Auschwitz, while his father died a few days after he and Hugo were liberated from Gunskirchen, a sub-camp of Mauthausen, in May 1945.

Gryn came to the United Kingdom in 1946, and was sent to board at the Polton House Farm School in Lasswade, near Edinburgh.  In 1950 he went to Cincinnati, where he studied for the rabbinate at the Hebrew Union College, a seminary for Reform rabbis.

Upon receiving his ordination, Gryn was sent to Bombay by the World Union for Progressive Judaism, which had sponsored his studies, and following a spell working for the Union and for the American Jewish Joint Distribution Committee in New York he returned to Britain in 1964, where he served in one of the largest congregations in Europe, the West London Synagogue, initially as assistant rabbi and later as senior rabbi, for 32 years.  Gryn became a regular radio broadcaster and appeared for many years on BBC Radio 4's  The Moral Maze.

In 1989, Gryn returned to Berehovo together with his daughter Naomi to make a film about his childhood. After his death, Naomi Gryn edited his autobiography, also called Chasing Shadows, which deals movingly with his experiences as a Holocaust survivor.

He married Jacqueline Selby on 1 January 1957 and they had four children together: Gaby, Naomi, Rachelle and David.

He died of cancer on 18 August 1996 and is buried at Hoop Lane Cemetery in Golders Green, London. The grave lies in a relatively prominent location, just north-east of the main entrance. The Chief Rabbi at the time Jonathan Sacks refused to attend his funeral on principle. Sacks wrote in later leaked private correspondence that as part of reform, Rabbi Gryn was a part of a "false grouping" and one of "those who destroy the faith".

He was described as "probably the most beloved rabbi in Great Britain" by Rabbi Albert Friedlander, who was also the author of the entry about Gryn in the Oxford Dictionary of National Biography.

References

External links
 Hugo Gryn interviewed by Sue Lawley on BBC Radio 4's Desert Island Discs, 10 July 1994
 Imperial War Museum oral history interview conducted in May 1986
 Michael Freedland: "Everyone's chief rabbi", The Jewish Chronicle, 26 May 2016
 

1930 births
1996 deaths
20th-century English rabbis
Auschwitz concentration camp survivors
British broadcasters
Ukrainian-Jewish emigrants to the United Kingdom
British Reform rabbis
Burials at Golders Green Jewish Cemetery
Czechoslovak emigrants to England
Czechoslovak Jews
People from Berehove
Rabbis from London
West London Synagogue
Deaths from cancer in England